Fergus may refer to:

Given name or surname 
Fergus (name), including lists of people and fictional and mythological characters

Places 
Fergus, Ontario, Canada
River Fergus, County Clare, Ireland
Lake Fergus, South Island, New Zealand
Loch Fergus, South Ayrshire, Scotland
Fergus, California, United States, an unincorporated community
Fergus County, Montana, United States

Other uses 
Cyclone Fergus, in the 1996–97 South Pacific cyclone season
, a US Navy attack transport ship of World War II
, a Royal Canadian Navy Second World War corvette
Fergus (novel), by Brian Moore

See also

Roman de Fergus, an Arthurian romance probably written at the beginning of the 13th century
 
 Fergie (disambiguation)
 Ferguson (disambiguation)
 Fergusson (disambiguation)